The Dakota Jazz Club and Restaurant is a jazz club in Minneapolis, Minnesota. The club opened in 1985 at Bandana Square in St. Paul as a restaurant with local jazz in the bar. In 1988, the programming expanded to national artists with performances by McCoy Tyner and Ahmad Jamal. In 2003, the Dakota moved to downtown Minneapolis on Nicollet Mall.

History

The list of jazz musicians who have played the Dakota includes Patricia Barber, Charles Brown, Ray Brown, James Carter, Bill Carrothers, Regina Carter, Larry Coryell, Joey DeFrancesco, Kurt Elling, Sonny Fortune, Von Freeman, Benny Green, Roy Hargrove, Roy Haynes, Zakir Hussain, Ahmad Jamal, Billy Higgins, Bobby Hutcherson, Charles Lloyd, Frank Morgan, Jack McDuff, Jimmy McGriff, Pat Martino, Nicholas Payton, Madeleine Peyroux, Joshua Redman, Wallace Roney, Arturo Sandoval, Toots Thielemans, McCoy Tyner, Joe Williams, and Chucho Valdés.

The Dakota opened as a restaurant that featured jazz. Although music has become what it is now most widely known for, food has continued to be a significant part of the Dakota. The Dakota was one of the first Minnesota restaurants featuring "farm-to-table," working closely with Minnesota growers and developing a new "Midwestern Cuisine" under original Chef Ken Goff. The Dakota was one of three midwestern restaurants (along with Prairie in Chicago) to be featured in a major New York Times article about the emergence of a regional cuisine in the Midwest. Since then, the Dakota has continued to emphasize fresh ingredients from sustainable sources and continues its creative culinary approach.

References

External links
Urban listening room: Dakota
"City Pages" Best Jazz Club 2011
Jazz Police Dakota Jazz Club Review
 

Jazz clubs in the United States
Music venues in Minnesota
Music venues completed in 1985
1985 establishments in Minnesota